ANOTA or Anota can refer to:
Amma Nanna O Tamila Ammayi, a Tollywood film
Anota Schltr., a synonym of the orchid genus Rhynchostylis.
Anota Gray, 1863, a synonym of the turtle genus Pelusios.